Yevgeni Petrovich Dolgov (born 20 June 1969) is a former Soviet and Russian football player.

Club career
He played for three seasons in the Soviet Top League and Russian Premier League with FC Dynamo Moscow.

Honours
 Russian Premier League bronze: 1992, 1993.

International career
Dolgov played his only game for the Soviet Union on August 29, 1990 in a friendly against Romania.

References

External links
  Profile

1969 births
Sportspeople from Lipetsk
Living people
Soviet footballers
Soviet Union international footballers
Russian footballers
FC Dynamo Moscow players
FC Metallurg Lipetsk players
Guangzhou City F.C. players
Soviet Top League players
Russian Premier League players
Association football defenders
Russian expatriate footballers
Expatriate footballers in China
FC Iskra Smolensk players